The Men's 1 m springboard competition of the 2014 European Aquatics Championships was held on 19 August.

Results
The preliminary round was held at 10:00 and the final at 14:00.

Green denotes finalists

References

2014 European Aquatics Championships